The following is a timeline of the history of the city of Recife, Pernambuco state, Brazil.

Prior to 20th century

 1535 - Olinda settlement established by Duarte Coelho.
 1595 - Capture of Recife by English privateer James Lancaster.
 1630 - Siege of Recife (1630) by Dutch forces.
 1637 - Kahal Zur Israel Synagogue built.
 1649 - Second Battle of Guararapes
 1654 - Recapture of Recife by Portuguese forces.
 1667 -  (church) established (approximate date).
 1710 - Mascate War begins.
 1720 -  (church) built.
 1767 - Basilica and Convent of Nossa Senhora do Carmo, Recife (church) built.
 1817 - Pernambucan Revolt
 1824 - Confederation of the Equator
 1825 - Diário de Pernambuco newspaper begins publication.
 1848 - Praieira Revolt
 1850 - Santa Isabel Theater opens.
 1855 - Malakoff Tower built.
 1861 -  completed.
 1862 -  founded.
 1866 - Provincial Assembly palace built.
 1872 - Population: 116,671.
 1875 - Mercado de São José built.

20th century

 1901 - Clube Náutico Capibaribe (sports club) formed.
 1904 - Population: 186,000.
 1905 - Sport Club do Recife formed.
 1909 - Pernambuco Federal Institute founded.
 1914 - Santa Cruz Futebol Clube formed.
 1917 - Labor strike.
 1919 -  newspaper begins publication.
 1920 - Population: 238,843.
 1929 - Museum of the State of Pernambuco opens.
 1939
 Jardim Zoobotânico de Dois Irmãos (zoo) established.
 Estádio dos Aflitos (stadium) opens.
 1940 - Population: 348,424.
 1946 - Federal University of Pernambuco established.
 1950 - Population: 512,370.
 1958 -  founded.
 1960 - Population: 788,336.
 1966 - Universidade de Pernambuco established.
 1970 - Population: 1,046,454.
 1972 - Estádio do Arruda (stadium) opens.
 1978 - Galo da Madrugada (parade) begins.
 1985 - Recife Metro begins operating.
 1991 - Population: 1,296,995.
 1993 - Population: 1,314,857 (estimate).
 1997 - Recife Cinema Festival begins.
 2000 - Population: 1,422,905.

21st century

 2001 -  becomes mayor.
 2002 - Ricardo Brennand Institute established.
 2004 - Recife/Guararapes–Gilberto Freyre International Airport terminal built.
 2008 -  established.
 2009 -  becomes mayor.
 2010 - Population: 1,546,516.
 2011 - 13 July: Airplane crash in Boa Viagem.
 2012 - 7 October:  held.
 2013
 Geraldo Júlio becomes mayor.
 Itaipava Arena Pernambuco opens in nearby São Lourenço da Mata.
 2014 -  begins broadcasting.
 2016 - 2 October:  held.

See also
 Recife history
 
 List of mayors of Recife
 History of Pernambuco

References

This article incorporates information from the Portuguese Wikipedia and Dutch Wikipedia.

Bibliography

in English

in Portuguese

External links

 
 Map of Recife, 1985
 Items related to Recife, various dates (via Digital Public Library of America)

Recife